Gymnoconia nitens is a species of rust fungus in the Phragmidiaceae family. It is a plant pathogen, and causes orange rust on various berries. The species was originally described in 1822 by mycologist Lewis David de Schweinitz as Aecidium luminatum.

References

External links 
 USDA ARS Fungal Database

Fungal plant pathogens and diseases
Pucciniales
Fungi described in 1822